HMS Sunfish was a Royal Navy S-class submarine which was launched on 30 September 1936 and served in the Second World War. Sunfish is one of 12 boats named in the song Twelve Little S-Boats.

Service history
At the onset of the Second World War, Sunfish was a member of the 2nd Submarine Flotilla. From 26–29 August 1939, the flotilla deployed to its war bases at Dundee and Blyth.

She spent an eventful period with the Royal Navy on the outbreak of war, and was commanded for much of her career in the war by Lieutenant Commander J.E. Slaughter. In February 1940, she attacked the German U-boat , but missed, and in April sank two German merchant ships, Amasis and Antares, and narrowly missed Hanau and an auxiliary patrol vessel.

She also sank two German 'Q ships' that month, Schürbeck and Oldenburg. On 7 December 1940, she sank the Finnish merchant  and damaged the Norwegian merchant Dixie off Norway.

Sunfish was transferred to the Soviet Navy in 1944 and renamed V-1.

She did not spend long under Soviet command, being bombed and sunk in error by a RAF Coastal Command Liberator off Norway, during passage from Dundee to Murmansk on 27 July 1944. Her commander – Capt. 2nd rank Fisanovich – had allegedly taken her out of her assigned area and she was diving when the aircraft came in sight instead of staying on the surface and firing recognition signals as instructed. All crew – including the British liaison staff – were lost. However, both the Royal Navy and RAF inquiries found that the RAF aircrew, who were at least 80 miles off course and who ignored unmistakable signs that the submarine was friendly, were fully responsible. The submarine's 50 Soviet and one British crew are all commemorated on Dundee International Submarine Memorial.

See also

References

Sources
 
 

British S-class submarines (1931)
Ships built in Chatham
1936 ships
World War II submarines of the United Kingdom
Maritime incidents in 1939
British S-class submarines (1931) of the Soviet Navy
World War II submarines of the Soviet Union
World War II shipwrecks in the Atlantic Ocean
Submarines sunk by aircraft
Soviet Union–United Kingdom relations
Friendly fire incidents of World War II
Maritime incidents in July 1944
Ships sunk by British aircraft
Ships lost with all hands